Man is an uninhabited island in the Nicobar district of Andaman and Nicobar Islands, India.

Administration
The island belongs to the township of Nancowry of Teressa Taluk.

Geography
The island is a part of the Nicobar Islands chain, located in the northeast Indian Ocean between the Bay of Bengal and the Andaman Sea. 
It is located  SSE of Cape Winifred of Tillangchong island.

Image gallery

References 

Islands of the Andaman and Nicobar Islands
Nicobar district
Uninhabited islands of India
Islands of India
Islands of the Bay of Bengal